Calvin Maples Cureton (September 1, 1874 – April 8, 1940) was the chief justice of the Texas Supreme Court from 1921 to 1940.

Born near Walnut Springs in Bosque County, Texas, Cureton's father was a rancher and his grandfather was a pioneer soldier. After the death of his mother when he was five years old, Cureton was raised by his father and grandparents. He studied at the University of Virginia from 1892 to 1893, but a faltering economy forced his return to Texas, where he read law to gain admission to the bar in 1897.

He served in the Texas voluntary infantry during the Spanish–American War in 1898, and served in the Texas Legislature from 1909 to 1912, and as Texas Attorney General from 1918 to 1921. His service in that office ended when Governor Pat Morris Neff appointed Cureton to the position of Chief Justice of the Texas Supreme Court, the seat having been vacated by the resignation of Nelson Phillips. Cureton was re-elected to the position four times, the fourth time without opposition.

At the time of his death, he was the longest-serving Chief Justice in the history of the court.

He died from chronic heart disease.

References

Justices of the Texas Supreme Court
1874 births
1940 deaths
People from Bosque County, Texas
University of Virginia alumni
U.S. state supreme court judges admitted to the practice of law by reading law
Texas Attorneys General